Dr. Renu Jogi is an Indian politician. She was elected to the Chhattisgarh Legislative Assembly from Kota in the 2018 Chhattisgarh Legislative Assembly election as a member of the Janta Congress Chhattisgarh. She is wife of 1st Chief Minister of Chhattisgarh Ajit Jogi.

References

1957 births
Living people
Janta Congress Chhattisgarh politicians
Indian National Congress politicians from Chhattisgarh
People from Raipur, Chhattisgarh
Chhattisgarh MLAs 2018–2023
Chhattisgarh MLAs 2003–2008
Chhattisgarh MLAs 2008–2013
Chhattisgarh MLAs 2013–2018